Thomas Brodegate (by 1485–1526) was an English politician.

Brodegate was mayor of Salisbury 1520–21. He was a Member (MP) of the Parliament of England for Salisbury in 1515.

References

15th-century births
1526 deaths
English MPs 1515
Mayors of Salisbury